The 2015 IIHF U18 World Championship Division I were a pair of international under-18 ice hockey tournaments organised by the International Ice Hockey Federation. The Division I A and Division I B tournaments represent the second and the third tier of the IIHF World U18 Championship.

Division I A
The Division I A tournament was played in Debrecen, Hungary, from 12 to 18 April 2015.

Participants

Standings

Results
All times are local. (Central European Summer Time – UTC+2)

Statistics and awards

Scoring leaders 
GP = Games played; G = Goals; A = Assists; Pts = Points; +/− = Plus-minus; PIM = Penalties In Minutes
Source: IIHF.com

Goaltending leaders 
(minimum 40% team's total ice time)

TOI = Time on ice (minutes:seconds); GA = Goals against; GAA = Goals against average; Sv% = Save percentage; SO = Shutouts
Source: IIHF.com

IIHF best player awards
 Goaltender:  Alexander Osipkov
 Defenceman:  Andreas Marthinsen
 Forward:  Mathias From

Division I B
The Division I B tournament was played in Maribor, Slovenia, from 12 to 18 April 2015.

Participants

Standings

Results
All times are local. (Central European Summer Time – UTC+2)

Statistics and awards

Scoring leaders 
GP = Games played; G = Goals; A = Assists; Pts = Points; +/− = Plus-minus; PIM = Penalties In Minutes
Source: IIHF.com

Goaltending leaders 
(minimum 40% team's total ice time)

TOI = Time on ice (minutes:seconds); GA = Goals against; GAA = Goals against average; Sv% = Save percentage; SO = Shutouts
Source: IIHF.com

IIHF best player awards
 Goaltender:  Dominic Divis
 Defenceman:  Mark Cepon
 Forward:  Christof Kromp

References

2015 IIHF World U18 Championships
IIHF World U18 Championship Division I
International ice hockey competitions hosted by Hungary
International ice hockey competitions hosted by Slovenia
IIHF
IIHF